Baselios Poulose Second (BPS) College Piramadom (Malayalam : ബസേലിയോസ് പൗലോസ്‌ സെക്കന്റ്‌ കോളേജ്, പിറമാടം) is located at Piramadom near Muvattupuzha, Ernakulam district of Kerala State, Republic of India. This  institution affiliated to the Mahatma Gandhi University, established in 2003 in the unaided sector.

Profile
BPS College is one of the five colleges managed by the Malankara Jacobite Syrian Christian Education Trust, Malekruz. The college is affiliated to the Mahatma Gandhi University, Kottayam and is one among the best arts and commerce colleges of university. This is a minority community institution. This institution is named after the former supreme head of the Jacobite Syrian Church in India, HB Baselios Poulose Second, the catholicose. This institution is vested in 2003 with a mission and a vision.

The college started in August 2003 and is located at Piramadom near the St. Antony's Dayara. It is situated on a hilltop with serene science beauty and a calm atmosphere for learning.

Academic courses
Undergraduate and post graduate courses are offered in this college.

Undergraduate

Postgraduate

Mode of Admission
Candidates for admission will have passed the higher secondary examination conducted by boards or departments recognized by the university, obtaining not less than 50% marks.

Facilities
 Computer Laboratory 	  	 
 Library 	  	 
 Women's Counselling Center 	  	 
 National Service Scheme
 Tourism Club
 Nature Club
 MGJSM

Institutions under the same management
 BPC College Piravom

External links
 Official website of the college

References

Christian universities and colleges in India
Universities and colleges in Ernakulam district
Colleges affiliated to Mahatma Gandhi University, Kerala
Educational institutions established in 2003
2003 establishments in Kerala